Jacob Two-Two is a Canadian animated series based on the Jacob Two-Two books written by Mordecai Richler. The series was produced by Nelvana in association with YTV and Salter Street Films, with 9 Story Entertainment taking over production in Series 5.

The show first aired on September 7, 2003 on YTV in Canada. The series ended on May 19, 2006 after 5 seasons.

Synopisis
After Jacob and his family moved to Montreal, he begins new challenges and stuff in his hometown. Jacob, his siblings, and his mother were named after Richler's children and wife.

Characters

Main cast
Jacob
The youngest of five children, Jacob got his 'Two-Two' nickname because he always had to say everything twice to be heard amongst his large family when he was smaller. Now a little older, Jacob does not repeat himself as often, but still frequently falls back into this old habit. He inadvertently causes trouble because he always tells the truth. He looks up to his siblings, especially Daniel, (although he finds himself frequently left out of their activities) and wishes he had their experience and wisdom. His naïveté makes him a frequent target of twin siblings Noah and Emma and their fantastic yarns. Voiced and narrated by Billy Rosemberg, best known in the United States as the voice of Max from Max & Ruby.

Morty
Loosely based on author and creator Mordecai Richler, Jacob's father is the writer of a series of adventure books about "The Amazing Ronald." He spends his time in his home office working out complex plots for his books, checking the hockey scores for his favourite team the Montreal Marvels (Parody of the Montreal Canadiens), or most often snoozing on the sofa with the newspaper draped over his face. He also loves jokes and making gentle fun of his children. Voiced by Harvey Atkin.

Florence
Jacob's mother is an expert juggler of tasks, happiest when operating at full throttle. Besides keeping her family on the go and organized, she also holds down a full-time job. As busy as she is, Florence always manages to look very chic and 'pulled together', and breezes through each day with effortless grace. Voiced by Janet-Laine Green.

Daniel
The eldest sibling, Daniel is an aloof and hopelessly cynical teen. Permanently garbed in black, he is fully conversant in all the newest bands and music crazes. Daniel does not have much time for Jacob, but occasionally offers his kid brother a unique 'teen view' of the world. He was first voiced by Jeff Berg and later voiced by Rob Tinkler.

Marfa
Jacob's elder sister, who is both academically and artistically inclined. Marfa is suffering through the toughest teen years and frequently takes it out on everyone around her. Preoccupied with her own concerns, Marfa has even less time for Jacob than Daniel. Convinced that Jacob ruins everything he touches, she does not like him going anywhere near her stuff. To Jacob, she occupies a mysterious world that he does not understand at all. Voiced by Jocelyn Barth.

Noah and Emma
Jacob's elder twin brother and sister. Energetic, athletic, full of daring and theatrical bravado. They have their own secret club, Kid Power, and spend long hours in their clubhouse in the yard fighting imaginary battles as their alter egos the intrepid Shapiro (Emma) and the fearless O'Toole (Noah). Up until the episode “Jacob Two-Two and the Uber Odor,” they wouldn’t allow Jacob into their 'clubhouse', which makes him long to get in there all the more. He often does their bidding in the hope that maybe this time they will let him inside. Noah is voiced by Marc McMulkin. Emma is voiced by Kaitlin Howell.

Buford Orville Gaylord Pugh
An odd little kid with a string of unfortunate names. His lack of anxiety and worries are not due to a lack of intelligence but to difficulty focusing. He is prone to recounting pointless, meandering shaggy dog stories. Buford and Jacob are both new kids at school. He is a good friend to Jacob. He also has a mother who he mentioned, but unseen. He mentioned that he has a father, but also unseen in the 2nd episode 'Jacob Two-Two and the Staff Room of Doom'. He also has mentioned and unseen aunts, cousins, and uncles as well. Voiced by Kristopher Clark.

Renée Ratelle
Though Renée and Jacob initially find themselves at odds with each other when they meet as classmates, Renée later joins forces with Jacob and Buford to solve a mystery. Since Renée is a hothead who does not always look before she leaps, it becomes Jacob's role to temper her enthusiasm. We know that she's French-Canadian due to her name and the way she speaks. She is voiced by Julie Lemieux.

Recurring cast
X. Barnaby Dinglebat
A mild mannered meter reader for the Montreal Gas Company on the surface, Dinglebat lets Jacob in on his secret profession: he is really an international spy. He is the only adult Jacob knows who always has time for him and treats him as an equal. Barnaby opens up a whole new world of adventure and possibility to his next door neighbour. Voiced by James Rankin.

Principal I.M. Greedyguts
Jacob's school principal is an obese glutton. Greedyguts also suffers from an enduring dislike of children, which causes him to be rather severe with his pupils. Though he is extremely fond of eating, his greed also extends to material possessions. He's voiced by Dwayne Hill.

Leo Louse
Leo works as the janitor at the school. When Greedyguts needs dirty work done, or a mess swept under the carpet, Leo is the man for the job. A weaselly man, a miser and mooch, Leo will swipe whatever isn't nailed down. Morty is mysteriously fond of Leo, much to the children's disgust, and whenever Leo drops by he'll fill his pockets with Florence's sandwiches. He is voiced by Howard Jerome.

Ms. Sour Pickle
Jacob's geography teacher Miss Sour Pickle has a permanent scowl plastered on her face, like she smells something bad. She glories in catching her students not paying attention or talking in class, then giving them snap quizzes on the obscure capitals of equally obscure countries. The only thing Sour Pickle loves to do more than torment Jacob is cheer for her favourite team, the marvelous Montreal Marvels. It's her biggest secret that she simply adores hockey. She is voiced by Fiona Reid.

Gary a.k.a. The Hooded Fang
The professional wrestler with the terrifying mask and bad guy image. His true nature, as Jacob discovers one day, is sweet and gentle. He only acts like a barbarian because it's written in his contract. He's really a big kid at heart, and becomes a great secret pal of Jacob's, occasionally helping out when a mission requires someone really really big. Voiced by Bret Hart.

Wilson, Quiggley and Duschane
Three bullies that always pick on Jacob and his friends. Wilson is the shortest one and the de facto leader, and mostly the brains who is always seen with a sour apple lollipop in his mouth and wears a hockey jersey that mostly represents the Montreal Canadiens red/home jersey. Quiggley is the kid with his hair covering his eyes. Duschane is the boy with braces and is the tallest. They often call Jacob "Jacob Boo-Hoo" or "Jacob Two-Four". They sometimes serve as allies to Jacob, but other times serves as antagonists.

Miss Darling Sweetiepie
A nice kind old lady who is Jacob's neighbor. Despite her elderly appearance, she is actually a secret agent.

Nurse Bunyan
The school nurse who has a crush on Leo Louse.

Miss Bella Bountiful
The school's lunch lady who is kind and sweet and serves the kids a healthy and delicious lunch.

Auntie Goodforyou
Jacob's aunt who serves nutritious but disgusting food. She appears in the episode 'Jacob Two-Two and the Mouldy Menace'. Her real name is unknown nor mentioned.

Zadie Saul
Jacob's paternal grandfather who comes around when Morty is preparing bagels.

Ann
An android (hence her name) from Japan designed to be the perfect student. Voiced by Tajja Isen.

Brainy
An intelligent student who is a fan of the comics Jacob loves.

Lloyd
An overweight arrogant student who is a fan of the comics Jacob loves.

Melinda Green
A mathematics genius who helped Jacob in the Scholars for Dollars training. She has an older sister named Phoebe who Daniel has a crush on.

Miss Louse
Leo's miserly mother who regrets having him as a son.

YB Greedyguts
Principal Greedyguts's twin brother who is crueler than him.

Carl Fester King
A pompous con man dressed in king garb and accountant style desiring money.

Fish & Fowl
Criminal duo that commits crime to get quick money. Fish's appearance is based on a fish and Fowl's appearance is based on a bird.

Agent Intrepid
A hamster secret agent.

Claude LaToque
The ghost of a coureur des bois (Canadien woodsman) who occasionally comes to Jacob's rescue.

Episodes

Broadcast
In March 2004, Fox Kids Europe acquired the pay television rights to the show's first two seasons for the United Kingdom, Ireland, Scandinavia, Italy, Germany, Spain, Portugal and the Netherlands.

The show also aired on Qubo in the United States (being one of the first cartoons to have aired on Qubo) and on the French-language network VRAK.TV as Jacob Jacob.

References

External links
 The archived Jacob Two Two website, as seen on September 23rd, 2017
 Jacob Two Two on YTV

Canadian television shows based on children's books
2003 Canadian television series debuts
2006 Canadian television series endings
Canadian children's animated comedy television series
Canadian children's animated fantasy television series
Canadian flash animated television series
2000s Canadian animated television series
Television series by Nelvana
Television series by 9 Story Media Group
YTV (Canadian TV channel) original programming
Animated television series about children
Television shows set in Montreal
Qubo